Francois Laydu (10 February 1960 – 2017) was a Swiss footballer who played in the 1980s and early 1990s as defender.

Laydu played his youth football by FC Montreux-Sports and advanced to their first team during the 1979–80 season in the 1st League. In summer 1980 he transferred to FC La Chaux-de-Fonds who played in the Nationalliga B, the second tier of Swiss football. In the 1982–83 season La Chaux-de-Fonds, with Laydu as central defender, achieved promotion to the Nationalliga A. In the following season Laydu played in all 30 of the seasons league games-

Laydu joined FC Basel's first team for their 1985–86 season under team manager Helmut Benthaus. Laydu played his domestic league debut for his new club in the home game in the St. Jakob Stadium on 17 August 1985 as Basel were defeated 0–3 by Wettingen. He stayed with the club for just six months and during this time Laydu played a total of 17 games for Basel without scoring a goal. Three of these games were in the Nationalliga A, one in the Swiss Cup and 13 were friendly games.

Following his time in Basel, Laydu moved on and played three and a half years for FC Locarno and then he returned to La Chaux-de-Fonds for two seasons and then he retired from active football.

After his active career, with his passion for football and his competence as an official, Laydu joined the Neuchâtel Xamax board of directors. Later he was player advisor and manager.

Following the bankruptcy of FC Lausanne-Sport, which was declared in 2003, François Laydu was administerator of the club and became sporting director. He was the origin of the rescue  and notably played an important role in the reconstruction of the club.

Laydu died in March 2017 at the age of 57 after a long, incurable illness. In Laydus honor, the management of FC Lausanne-Sport stated in their tribute, his unfailing commitments during his years with the club for which he had a real passion. Further they stated, “everyone who had worked with him, still have in mind the image of a loyal and competent man, appreciated by all fellow workers.”

References

Sources
 
 Die ersten 125 Jahre. Publisher: Josef Zindel im Friedrich Reinhardt Verlag, Basel. 
 Verein "Basler Fussballarchiv" Homepage

FC La Chaux-de-Fonds players
FC Basel players
FC Locarno players
Swiss men's footballers
Association football defenders
1960 births
2017 deaths
Swiss Super League players